European route E 717 is a European B class road in Italy, connecting the cities Turin — Savona. It has a total length of 141 km (88 mi).

Route 
 
 E70, E64, E612 Turin
 E80 Savona

External links 
 UN Economic Commission for Europe: Overall Map of E-road Network (2007)
 International E-road network

International E-road network
Roads in Italy